The MEAC/SWAC Challenge is an annual historically black college (HBCU) football game showcasing a team from each of the two NCAA Division I conferences made up entirely of HBCUs—the Mid-Eastern Athletic Conference (MEAC) and Southwestern Athletic Conference (SWAC). The series began in 2005 and initially paired the defending conference champions, although the selection process was broadened in 2007 to include non-champions as well. Following the 2022 game, the MEAC leads the series with 10 wins to the SWAC's five (along with a "no contest" game in 2016, and a cancellation in 2020). The Challenge is televised nationally on ESPN and is owned by ESPN Events. It was historically associated with the Labor Day weekend, but starting in 2021 has instead taken place a week earlier during college football's Week 0.

History
South Carolina State beat Alabama State in the first Challenge in 2005, and for its first three years the event was held in Birmingham, Alabama (home of the SWAC's offices), at Legion Field. In 2007, the event attracted its largest crowd—over 30,000—as Southern beat Florida A&M and earned the SWAC's first victory in the series. In 2008, the Challenge moved to Orlando, Florida after a new sponsorship was announced; Walt Disney World Resort would sponsor the event for eight years until 2015. From 2008 to 2013, as well as in 2015, it was held in Orlando at the Florida Citrus Bowl, now called Camping World Stadium. In 2014, the game was played at Spectrum Stadium, now known as FBC Mortgage Stadium, as Camping World Stadium underwent renovations.

In April 2016, it was announced that the game would move to campus sites for 2016 and 2017 (on September 4, 2016, Bethune–Cookman attempted to host Alcorn State in Daytona Beach, Florida, but the game was halted before halftime due to lightning associated with feeder bands from Hurricane Hermine; on September 3, 2017, Southern hosted South Carolina State in Baton Rouge, Louisiana). The event moved to a non-HBCU campus venue in 2018—this time at Center Parc Stadium on the campus of Georgia State University in Atlanta.

Nine future NFL Draft picks have played in the Challenge. They are Phillip Adams (South Carolina State), Michael Coe (Alabama State), Johnny Culbreath (South Carolina State), Justin Durant (Hampton), Javon Hargrave (South Carolina State), Temarrick Hemingway (South Carolina State), Curtis Holcomb (Florida A&M), Tarvaris Jackson (Alabama State), and Kendall Langford (Hampton).

The 2020 game, as well as the Celebration Bowl, were both canceled due to the COVID-19 pandemic (in particular, due to a decision by the MEAC to cancel all fall sports for the 2020 season).

Game results

See also
List of black college football classics

Footnotes

References

External links
 

Black college football classics
Mid-Eastern Athletic Conference football
Southwestern Athletic Conference football
American football in Birmingham, Alabama
American football competitions in Atlanta
American football in Orlando, Florida
Sports competitions in Birmingham, Alabama
2005 establishments in Alabama
Recurring sporting events established in 2005